Brian 'Barney' Kennett (born 1955) is a former English motorcycle speedway rider in the British National League. Born in Orpington, he is part of a speedway family which includes brothers Gordon Kennett and Dave Kennett, and nephew Edward Kennett.

Kennett was the longest serving rider for the Canterbury Crusaders (speedway), riding from 1971 to 1984.

In 1973 Kennett was runner-up to Peter Collins (speedway rider) in the British Under 21 Speedway Championship. The same year he became the most expensive Division Two rider in a transfer deal. Hackney Hawks boss Len Silver paid a record £1500.01 to Canterbury Crusaders, adding the 1p to beat the record paid previously by Oxford Rebels for Gordon Kennett, his brother, to transfer from Eastbourne Eagles. Despite this deal, Johnny Hoskins, boss of the Crusaders, wrote-in a loan-back clause, meaning that Canterbury Crusaders could still call on Kennett to ride for them.

References

External links
 Canterburycrusaders.co.uk
 Hackneyreunion.com
 Sheffield-tigers.co.uk
 "Barney Kennet", Proboards.com

1955 births
English motorcycle racers
British speedway riders
Canterbury Crusaders riders
Hackney Hawks riders
Eastbourne Eagles riders
Oxford Cheetahs riders
Reading Racers riders
Living people